Monforte del Cid is a village in the province of Alicante and autonomous community of Valencia, Spain.

Toponymy

See also: Mons Fortis (toponym) .
In the thirteenth century, the town was called Nompot (as stated in the charter of the city of Alicante). On December 28 of 1328 the king Alfonso "El Benigno" gave Nompot village as part of a series of towns and villages in inheritance to his other son, the infant "Fernando de la Cerda". In an account book of Don Fernando from 1355, it already mentions the town with the name of "Monfort".

After the conflict of "The Two Pedros" between Pedro I of Castile and Pedro IV of Aragon, Monfort tried to separate from the Crown of Aragon to switch to that of Castile. In punishment, Pedro IV demoted  it back to the "village", returned the toponym "Nompot" and passed a law that said the population would remain "im perpetuom" to the, by then, Villa de Alicante. Approximately five years later, it retrieved the name of Monfort.

In 1708 the name was "translated" into Spanish as "Monforte" and in 1916, the Presidency of the Council of Ministers, according to Royal Decree of June 27 of 1916, adopted the name as "Monforte de la Rambla". But that same year, at a meeting at City Hall at the request of the majority of the population (who did not like that name) formally requested the change of name to the current "Monforte del Cid"; SIENDA approved the request by Royal Decree of 4 December 1916.

Geography

The municipality belongs to the Shire of Middle Vinalopó, located in the transition from the corridors to the arid plains subbéticos precoastal Alicante.

The municipality also has the main village, with the village of Orito, important pilgrimage center around the figure of San Pascual Bailon and several housing estates such as the Captain or Alenda Golf, located near the Portichol.
It borders the towns of Alicante, Elche, Aspe, Novelda, Agost and Petrel.

References

Populated places in the Province of Alicante